The 2022 Postnord UCI WWT Vårgårda West Sweden was a women's bicycle race and was the 18th round of the 2022 UCI Women's World Tour. It was held on 7 August 2022, in Vårgårda, Sweden, the day after the 2022 Postnord Vårgårda WestSweden TTT.

Teams

Fourteen professional teams, and the Swedish national teams, each with a maximum of six riders, started the race:

UCI Women's WorldTeams

 
 
 
 
 
 
 
 

UCI Women's Continental Teams

 
 
 
 

National teams: 
 Sweden

Results

External links

References

Open de Suède Vårgårda
Postnord UCI WWT Vargarda
Postnord UCI WWT Vargarda
UCI Women's World Tour races
Postnord UCI WWT Vargarda